Robert I. Marshall (born October 16, 1946 in Wilmington, Delaware) is an American politician and a former Democratic member of the Delaware Senate, representing the 3rd district from 1979  until 2019.

Education
Marshall earned his BA from Thomas Edison State College.

Elections
2012 Marshall won the three-way September 11, 2012 Democratic Primary with 2,504 votes (52.2%) and was unopposed for the November 6, 2012 General election, winning with 12,322 votes.
1978 When Democratic Senator George Schlor retired and left the District 13 seat open, Marshall won the 1978 Democratic Primary and won the November 7, 1978 General election with 3,159 votes (63%) against Republican nominee John Stawicki.
1982 Marshall won the 1982 Democratic Primary and was unopposed for the November 2, 1982 General election, winning with 5,886 votes (76%) against Republican nominee Samuel Moreno.
1984 Marshall won the 1984 Democratic Primary and was unopposed for the November 2, 1984 General election, winning with 7,825 votes.
1988 Marshall was unopposed for the September 10, 1988 Democratic Primary and won the November 8, 1988 General election with 6,611 votes.
1992 Marshall won the September 12, 1992 Democratic Primary with 2,484 votes (70%) against Wesley Smith, running as a Democrat, and was unopposed for the November 3, 1992 General election, winning with 7,759 votes.
1994 Marshall was unopposed for the Democratic Primary and won the three-way November 8, 1994 General election with 4,696 votes (76.8%) against Republican nominee Dwight Davis and Wesley Smith, running as the Libertarian candidate.
1998 Marshall won the September 12, 1998 Democratic Primary with 1,344 votes (74.8%) and the November 3, 1998 General election, winning with 4,135 votes (85.1%) against Wesley Smith, running as the Republican nominee.
2002 Marshall won the September 10, 2002 Democratic Primary with 1,359 votes (76.0%) and won the November 5, 2002 General election with 4,548 votes (75.0%) against Republican nominee Michael Brown.
2004 Marshall was unopposed for both the September 11, 2004 Democratic Primary and the November 2, 2004 General election, winning with 9,343 votes.
2008 Marshall was unopposed for both the September 9, 2008 Democratic Primary and the November 4, 2008 General election, winning with 10,225 votes.

References

External links
 

1946 births
Living people
Democratic Party Delaware state senators
People from Wilmington, Delaware
Thomas Edison State University alumni
21st-century American politicians